Fortune Island can refer to:

Fortune Island (Bahamas), usually known as Long Cay
Fortune Island (Philippines), an island in Nasugbu, Batangas, site of the sinking of the San Diego in 1600
Fortune Island, in Fortune Lake, North Frontenac, Ontario, Canada
Fortune Islet (îlet Fortune), island in Goyave, Guadeloupe
Fortunes Island, in Lake of the Woods, Ontario, Canada
Fortune Islands, part of the Kerguelen Islands

See also
Fortune (disambiguation)